Stiletto is a 2008 American direct-to-video action film directed by Nick Vallelonga and produced by Nick Vallelonga and Warren Ostergard.  It stars Tom Berenger, Michael Biehn, Stana Katic, William Forsythe, and Tom Sizemore. It premiered at Newport Beach International Film Festival on April 28, 2008, and was released on DVD March 3, 2009 by First Look Studios.

Plot 
Two crime lords, Virgil Vadalos (Berenger), a wealthy Greek mafia boss and an MS-13 leader meet in a bathhouse to discuss business. A woman appears in the room with a stiletto switchblade knife, and kills the MS-13 leader, before stabbing Virgil, leaving him for dead. Virgil survives, however, and orders his men and a corrupt LAPD detective to find the woman, whom he identifies as his lover, Raina (Katic). Virgil is puzzled by Raina's seemingly random attacks and seeks an explanation for her actions. Making things worse for Virgil is the disappearance of $2 million in cash. Virgil's two top henchmen—the intense Lee (Biehn) and scheming Alex (Forsythe)—dislike each other and suspect the other of being involved with the disappearance.

Raina, meanwhile, is seeking out men who wronged her in the past. She hunts down, seduces and kills several men from several different gangs, throwing the underworld further into mayhem. As she kills one after another, she is headed straight for her original target: Virgil.

Cast
 Stana Katic as Raina
 Tom Berenger as Virgil Vadalos
 Michael Biehn as Lee
 Paul Sloan as Beck
 William Forsythe as Alex
 Diane Venora as Sylvia Vadalos
 Kelly Hu as Detective Hanover
 Amanda Brooks as Penny
 James Russo as Engelhart
 Tom Sizemore as "Large" Bills
 Dominique Swain as Nancy
 Tony Lip as Gus
 D. B. Sweeney as Danny
 David Proval as Mohammad
 Robert R. Shafer as Krieger
 R. A. Mihailoff as "Big Arms", Nazi Biker
 Andrew Bryniarski as Nazi Biker

Music 
 Cliff Martinez
 "Broken" – Performed by Jacqueline Lord
 Written by Jacqueline Lord
 Produced by Michael Lord
 Mixed by Tom Lord Alge

 "Bang Bang" – Performed by ER Inc
 Written by Edgard Jaude, Rafael Torres, Kevin Davis and Garrett Wesley

 "Fallen Angel" – Written and performed by Chris Vaughn
 The song "Lipimena Ta Tragoudia" was featured by Viktor Mastoridis

References

External links 
 
 
 

2008 films
2008 action thriller films
2008 crime thriller films
2008 crime drama films
American action thriller films
American crime drama films
American crime thriller films
Films shot in Los Angeles
Girls with guns films
Films scored by Cliff Martinez
Films directed by Nick Vallelonga
2000s English-language films
2000s American films